Peep Show or Peepshow may refer to:
Peep show, a live sex show or pornographic film viewed through a slot
Raree show, an exhibition of pictures or objects viewed through a hole

Music
 Peep Show (Alternative TV album), 1987
 Peep Show (Goudie album), 2000
 Peepshow (album), by Siouxsie & the Banshees, 1988
 "Peep Show", a song by 50 Cent from Curtis, 2007
 "Peep Show", a song by SikTh, 2003
 Peepshow tour, a concert tour by Barenaked Ladies

Television
 Peep Show (British TV series), a 2003–2015 sitcom
 Peep Show (Canadian TV series), a 1975–1976 drama anthology program
 The Peep Show, a faux chat show segment hosted by professional wrestler Christian

Other uses
 Peepshow (burlesque), a burlesque show created by Jerry Mitchell
 Peepshow (comics), a comics series by Joe Matt
 Peep Show (film), a 1956 short film by Ken Russell
 Peep Show, a film by Noel Lawrence (as J. X. Williams)
 Peepshow, a poetry collection by Valerie Grosvenor Myer
 Peepshow, a 2004 novel by Leigh Redhead